The Council of Three was a collegial body created by the Polish Government in Exile in 1954 with prerogatives of the President of Poland. It consisted of three members of the government chosen by the Rada Jedności Narodowej (Council of National Unity), a rump parliament in exile.

It was created in 1954, after president August Zaleski declined to leave his office after his seven-year term ended. According to the Polish April 1935 constitution, the legal basis for the existence of the government in exile, the president was allowed to choose his successor "during a war, in case his office falls vacant before the peace treaty is signed". The post-war Akt Zjednoczenia Narodowego (National Unity Act) agreement among all the major political parties assumed that presidents were to choose their successors every seven years; however, this was rejected by Zaleski.

Initially, the Rada Trzech was a self-proclaimed committee of opposition to Zaleski, but on 21 July 1956 the Rada Jedności Narodowej granted it powers of the Polish head of state. It was dissolved in July 1972, following August Zaleski's death on 7 April that year. The Rada Trzech ceded its powers to Zaleski's successor, Stanisław Ostrowski.

Members
The members of the Rada Trzech were:
 General Władysław Anders (until 1970)
 Edward Raczyński (until 1972)
 Tomasz Arciszewski (until 1955)

Tomasz Arciszewski died in 1955. His place was taken by:
 General Tadeusz Bór-Komorowski (1956-1966)
 General Roman Odzierzyński (1966-1968)
 Stanisław Mglej (1968-1969)
 Alfred Urbański (1969-1972)

Władysław Anders died in 1970. His place was taken by:
 General Stanisław Kopański (1970-1972)

See also
 Polish Government in Exile

 
Polish People's Republic